Evangelos Vlasis (born 27 December 1944) is a Greek athlete. He competed in the men's triple jump at the 1968 Summer Olympics.

References

1944 births
Living people
Athletes (track and field) at the 1968 Summer Olympics
Greek male triple jumpers
Olympic athletes of Greece
Place of birth missing (living people)